FC Ebedei is a Nigerian football club based in Ijebu-Ode, Ogun State after moving from Lagos in 2001. They currently play in Nigeria Nationwide League, the third tier of Nigerian football.

FC Ebedei is also serving as the African football academy of FC Midtjylland in the Danish Superliga championship. Several players from the club have gone on to play in Denmark.

In the summer of 2022 star striker Olise Ogwu was linked with a transfer to English 2nd division side Millwall.

FC Midtjylland transfers
 The most talented player to have transferred to FC Midtjylland from Edebei is Paul Onuachu, a very tall and strong forward. The new Peter Crouch as Sky Sports called him after FC Midtjyllands victory in Europa League over Manchester United in February 2016. FC Midtjylland is expecting a very big future transfer on Paul Onauchu.

The first player who transferred to FC Midtjylland was Ajilore Oluwafemi. The midfielder debuted for FC Midtjylland in 2004, and earned a permanent place in the starting line-up in the 2006–07 Superliga season. He plays the role of a defensive midfielder.

He was followed by strikers Adeshina Lawal and Justice John Erhenede, though they did not break into the FC Midtjylland starting line-up. In 2004, they both transferred to Vejle BK in the secondary Danish 1st Division.

In the spring 2006, forward Akeem Agbetu earned a place in the FC Midtjylland first team squad, after Danish forward Frank Kristensen suffered an injury. Agbetu scored a couple of goals before he was loaned out to Kolding FC in the winter 2007 transfer window to earn some valuable experience.

In the summer 2006, the two players who were brought with him to the club, the 18-year-old players Adigun Salami and Ayinde Lawal, were brought into the FC Midtjylland squad. Salami proved a very big talent, and attracted attention from Italian club Reggina Calcio, as well as English clubs Chelsea and Manchester United. He plays the role of a defensive midfielder.

The next player to make the step from FC Ebedei to FC Midtjylland is Babajide Collins Babatunde, or simply known a Baba Collins, who would have made his FC Midtjylland debut at age 16 if not for FIFA rules. As he turned 18, he signed a four and a half-year professional contract with FC Midtjylland. In Spring 2007 he earned his debut, and quickly became a starter. He scored 2 goals in 8 matches.

Recent seasons
2004: Nigerian Division 1-B 9th
2005: Nigerian Division 1-B 15th (Relegated)
2006/07: Nigeria Amateur League (Promoted)
2007/08: Nigerian Division 1-B 10th
2008/09: Nigerian Division 1-B 15th (Relegated)
2009/10: Nigeria Amateur League 2nd, Group A (Promoted)
2010/11: Nigerian Division 1-B 15th (Relegated)
2012:    Nigerian Nationwide League 1st, Group A (sold promotion slot to Crown F.C.)

External links
 How Young is too young?
 allAfrica.com:  FC Ebedei Dumps Lagos for Ogun

Ebedei
Ogun State
Sports clubs in Nigeria